Sugar Baby Rojas (born January 2, 1961), is a Colombian professional boxer who held the lineal and WBC super flyweight titles.

World championship
On August 8, 1987, Rojas won the lineal and WBC super flyweight championship of the world by defeating Santos Laciar of Argentina via a unanimous decision.

See also
List of super-flyweight boxing champions

References

External links

Sugar Baby Rojas - CBZ Profile

1961 births
Living people
Super-flyweight boxers
World super-flyweight boxing champions
World Boxing Council champions
Colombian male boxers
Sportspeople from Barranquilla
20th-century Colombian people